Publicis Sapient is a global digital transformation consulting company and the digital business transformation independent subsidiary of Publicis Groupe with 20,000 people and over 50 offices worldwide. It was originally established as Sapient in Cambridge, Massachusetts in 1990. In 2015, Sapient became an Independent subsidiary of French multinational advertising firm Publicis, following a deal worth 3.7 billion dollars.It continues to remain headquartered in Boston Massachusetts and the leadership is retained.

In 2016, the company merged two of its divisions, SapientNitro and Razorfish, to form SapientRazorfish, which was led by Alan Wexler. A few years later, in 2019, SapientRazorfish and Sapient Consulting were consolidated into one brand, Publicis Sapient, under the leadership of CEO Nigel Vaz.

History
Early years

The company Sapient was founded on November 6, 1990 by Jerry Greenberg and J. Stuart Moore in Cambridge, Massachusetts. The company was established as a digital consulting firm and adopted a fixed-term, fixed-price model for IT consulting projects instead of charging on a time and materials basis. 

Sapient embraced internet-based technology early on and by 1999, internet-based work accounted for over 70% of its revenue. From 1992 to 2000, the company saw rapid growth, with revenue increasing from $950,000 to $503 million.

International expansion

Following the dot-com bubble burst in the early 2000s, Sapient looked to expand internationally to drive growth. The company implemented a strategy called "Global Distributed Delivery" which leveraged the rapidly growing tech market in India to grow its software development capabilities.

Throughout its history, Sapient has made several acquisitions, starting with Planning Group International in 2006. Other notable acquisitions include DCG Group in 2008, which enhanced its capital markets offerings, and The Nitro Group in 2009, which added 300 employees.

History of acquisitions

Corporate affairs
In 1996, Sapient made its initial public offering with a share price of $21. In the next four years, the technology sector saw an increase in share prices, leading to an increase in Sapient's shares to a split-adjusted price of $550. However, during the dot-com bust of 2000, Sapient's shares dropped to a low of $0.75 per share. The shares reached a peak of $17.95 in 2014.

References

Publicis Groupe
American companies established in 1990
Software companies established in 1990
Companies based in Boston
Companies formerly listed on the Nasdaq
Software companies based in Massachusetts
2015 mergers and acquisitions
American subsidiaries of foreign companies
Software companies of the United States